Drillia sowerbyi is a species of sea snail, a marine gastropod mollusk in the family Drilliidae.

Description
The length of the shell attains 11 mm, its diameter 4.5 mm.

Distribution
This marine species occurs off KwaZulu-Natal. South Africa

References

  Barnard K.H. (1958), Contribution to the knowledge of South African marine Mollusca. Part 1. Gastropoda; Prosobranchiata: Toxoglossa; Annals of The South African Museum v. 44 pp. 73–163
  Tucker, J.K. 2004 Catalog of recent and fossil turrids (Mollusca: Gastropoda). Zootaxa 682:1–1295

External links
 

Endemic fauna of South Africa
sowerbyi
Gastropods described in 1932